Wana may refer to:

Call signs
 WANA-LD, a television station licensed to Naples, Florida, United States
 WFZX, a radio station which used the callsign WANA until 2008, Anniston, Alabama, United States

Places 
 Wana, Nepal
 Wanna, Pakistan (or Wana), a city in South Waziristan, Pakistan
 Waña (Peru), a mountain in the Wansu mountain range in the Andes of Peru
 Wana, West Virginia, USA
 WANA, an abbreviation for West Asia and North Africa
 Wana Subdivision, Khyber Pakhtunkhwa, Pakistan

Other 
 Battle of Wana (2004), between the Pakistan Army and members al-Qaeda near Wanna, Pakistan
 "Wana" (song), a 1977 song by Japanese group Candies
 Wana, Hawaiian name for Diadema paucispinum, a sea urchin with venomous spines
 Wana (Telecommunications), a telecommunications company in Morocco, currently known as Inwi
 Wana Brigade, an Infantry formation of the Indian Army during World War II
 Wana Udobang or Wana Wana, Nigerian writer and filmmaker
 Wireless Amateur Network of Amaliada, in Amaliada, Greece

See also
 Wanas (4th century), a Coptic child martyr and the patron saint of lost things